KHMJ (95.1 FM) is a class A radio station broadcasting out of Trona, Inyo County, California.

History
The station began broadcasting on September 9, 2014.

References

External links
 

Inyo County, California
Radio stations established in 2014
HMJ
2014 establishments in California